ECSC may stand for:
European Coal and Steel Community, a forerunner of the European Union
Eastern Colleges Science Conference, an undergraduate research conference in the northeastern United States
Eastern Caribbean Supreme Court, a Caribbean court system established under the Organisation of Eastern Caribbean States
East Coast Surfing Championships, one of the United States Surfing Federation’s major amateur events
Expedia CruiseShipCenters
 European Cyber Security Challenge, is a ctf competition at European level